The 2014–15 Primeira Liga (also known as Liga NOS for sponsorship reasons) was the 81st season of the Primeira Liga, the top professional league for Portuguese association football clubs. It began on 15 August 2014 and concluded on 23 May 2015.

On 17 May 2015, Benfica won their second consecutive and 34th overall title.

Events
The league was scaled up to 18 teams, after the Court's rule to nullify Boavista's relegation from the Primeira Liga in the 2007–08 season. Boavista has been invited back in the Primeira Liga, after the club won a legal battle that eventually deemed their forced relegation five years ago unlawful. The club therefore went straight from the third level to the top league.

The league was named Liga ZON Sagres until 2013–14 after the sponsorship agreement between Sagres, ZON (now NOS) and the league ended. The league is named Liga NOS since 5 February 2015.

Teams

Stadia and locations

Personnel and sponsors

Managerial changes

Season summary

League table

Positions by round

Results

Season statistics

Top scorers

Hat-tricks

Awards

SJPF Player of the Month

SJPF Young Player of the Month

References

External links
 Primeira Liga at UEFA.com

Primeira Liga seasons
Port
1